Harald Gunnar Paalgard (born 4 May 1950) is a Norwegian cinematographer. He was educated at Dramatiska Institutet in Stockholm, Sweden.

Selected filmography
 1981: Martin
 1985: Orion's Belt
 1992: Svarte pantere
 1992: The Warrior's Heart
 1993: The Last Lieutenant
 2003: Arven
 2004: As It Is in Heaven
 2005: Arctic Passage
 2010: The Woman That Dreamed About a Man

External links
 
Harald Paalgard at the International Encyclopedia of Cinematographers

Norwegian cinematographers
1950 births
Living people
Best Cinematographer Guldbagge Award winners
Dramatiska Institutet alumni